Presidential Reunion is an American comedy Web short directed by Ron Howard and starring Saturday Night Live cast members who parodied Presidents Ford to Obama. The skit was released onto the Funny or Die website on March 3, 2010 and received mixed to negative reviews.

Plot 
The skit revolves around Barack Obama (Armisen) preparing for bed, but is too concerned about a problem with the banks and credit card companies in America. Michelle (Rudolph) convinces him to retire for the evening, but as soon as he does, former Presidents Bill Clinton (Hammond) and George W. Bush (Ferrell) enter the room. Clinton and Bush come to offer Obama advice as to how to handle the situation, reminiscing on their past duties. George H. W. Bush (Carvey) then exits the bathroom and offers his advice to the Obamas: to forget about approval rates. Jimmy Carter (Aykroyd) then enters the room (with a toolbox and begins fixing a random object on the wall) and is ridiculed by the other former presidents. Carter tells Obama to establish a consumer finance agency, stating people are becoming frustrated with being conned by banks and credit card companies. Ronald Reagan (Carrey) then appears before the group, surprising Carter (since Reagan is dead).

Reagan tells Obama to grow some balls in order to take on the banks and credit companies. Gerald Ford (Chase) too enters the room (tripping over a table, spoofing himself slipping on a set of stairs exiting Air Force One) and Chase breaking character, assuming it is another episode of SNL, only to be informed he's on Funny or Die. Ford suggests the only way to stop the banks is to pardon Richard Nixon (which he did). Carter interprets what Ford really means, but Ford is shocked to see Carter, thinking he was dead, only to be informed he was dead. The group ask Obama if their suggestions helped, but Obama dismisses them, saying they were the reason the mess was created. Reagan then quotes a false George Washington statement, saying Obama's it and the group begin taunting Obama until he wakes up and realizes that he does need to be the one to establish a CFA, rushing off to gather his cabinet.

Cast 
 Fred Armisen as Barack Obama
 Darrell Hammond as Bill Clinton
 Will Ferrell as George W. Bush
 Dana Carvey as George H. W. Bush
 Dan Aykroyd as Jimmy Carter
 Jim Carrey as Ronald Reagan (the only cast member on this video who did not portray the same role on Saturday Night Live)
 Chevy Chase as Gerald Ford
 Maya Rudolph as Michelle Obama

References

External links
 Official Website
 Presidential Reunion at the Internet Movie Database

2010 short films
2010 films
Films directed by Ron Howard
Cultural depictions of Barack Obama
Cultural depictions of Bill Clinton
Cultural depictions of George W. Bush
Cultural depictions of George H. W. Bush
Cultural depictions of Jimmy Carter
Cultural depictions of Ronald Reagan
2010 comedy films
2010s English-language films